Greece participated in the Eurovision Song Contest 1998 in Birmingham, United Kingdom. Thalassa represented Greece with the song "Mia krifi evaisthisia". They finished in 20th place out of 25 countries with 12 points.

Before Eurovision

National final 
Before the final, eight semi-finals were held at the ERT TV Studios in Athens, hosted by Giorgos Marinos. Televoting selected the winning song in each semi-final to qualify for the final.

Semi-finals

Final 
The final was held on 7 March 1998 at the ERT TV Studios in Athens, hosted by Giorgos Marinos. The winner was chosen by televoting. At the end of the event, Dionisia Karoki and Thalassa were selected to represent Greece with the Greek-language song "Mia krifi evaisthisia".

At Eurovision 
In the lead up to the event, the song's composer, Yiannis Valvis, was not happy with the way the group's performance was to be filmed and demanded changes. When his demands were not met, the group threatened to quit the contest on the morning of the final day of rehearsals, and on the afternoon, they pulled out. Only minutes after their withdrawal, however, the group returned to the green room, having decided to go through with the performance after all, without the composer watching them on stage. Valvis was not permitted to attend the contest, on account of his aggressive behavior. He watched the contest locked inside his hotel room with two security guards guarding his door.

Heading into the final of the contest, BBC reported that bookmakers ranked the entry 22nd out of the 25 entries. Thalassa performed 2nd on the night of the contest, following Croatia and preceding France. At the close of voting, "Mia krifi evaisthisia" received only 12 points, placing Greece 20th out of 25 entries. It was the worst Greek result in the contest at the time, and would remain so until 2016. The Greek televoting awarded its 12 points to Cyprus.

Due to a low average score over the past 5 contests, Greece was forced to sit out the 1999 contest.

Voting

References

1998
Countries in the Eurovision Song Contest 1998
Eurovision